Disa cornuta is a species of orchid found from Zimbabwe to South Africa.

References

External links

 
 

cornuta
Orchids of South Africa
Flora of Zimbabwe